The Juno Award for Breakthrough Group of the Year is presented by the Canadian Academy of Recording Arts and Sciences to the best new musical group in Canada. The award has been given annually since 1974, and was previously called Most Promising Group of the Year (1974–1993), Best New Group (1994–2002), and New Group of the Year (2003–2012). The award was customarily presented by the Minister of Canadian Heritage.

Recipients

Most Promising Group of the Year (1974–1993)

Best New Group (1994–2002)

New Group of the Year (2003–2012)

Breakthrough Group of the Year (2013–present)

References

Breakthrough Group